István Ágh (born István Nagy; 24 March 1938 in Iszkáz) is a Hungarian poet. He is the younger brother of László Nagy who was also a poet.

Awards
Kossuth Prize (1992)
Attila József Prize (1969) and (1980)

References 

1938 births
Living people
20th-century Hungarian poets
Hungarian male poets
People from Veszprém County
20th-century Hungarian male writers
Attila József Prize recipients